is a town located in Fukushima Prefecture, Japan. In 2010, the town had a population of 11,515. However, the town was totally evacuated in the aftermath of the Fukushima Daiichi nuclear disaster and residents were permitted return during daylight hours from May 2013. In April 2019, parts of the town were deemed to have been successfully decontaminated, with residents allowed to return to these areas.

, the town had an official registered population of 11,505 in 4,235 households; however, this number is due to the municipality continuing to keep track of its residents despite them having been evacuated elsewhere throughout the country. The actual population resident in the town was 2,578 people.

Geography
Ōkuma is located on the Pacific Ocean coastline of central Fukushima. Ōkuma lies in the center of the Hamadōri region of Fukushima, bordered to the west by the Abukuma Highlands and to the east by the Pacific Ocean. It is set between the cities of Namie and Futaba to the north, Tamura to the west, and Kawauchi and Tomioka to the south. The town is the site of the Fukushima Daiichi Nuclear Power Plant.

The  also flows within the town.

Surrounding municipalities
Fukushima Prefecture
Namie
Futaba
Tamura
Kawauchi
Tomioka

Demographics
Per Japanese census data, the population of Ōkuma grew steadily over the past 40 years until the nuclear disaster.

Climate
Ōkuma has a humid climate (Köppen climate classification Cfa).

History

Early history of the area
The area of present-day Ōkuma was part of Mutsu Province. 
While historical records are unclear, it is believed that the area of present-day Ōkuma was ruled by the Shineha clan beginning in the mid-12th century. Later, during the Sengoku period, in December 1492 the Sōma clan defeated the Shineha clan, and the area transferred to the Sōma clan's control.

The Iwaki-Sōma Road connected the region to Mito in the south and Sendai in the north. Modern-day National Route 6, which runs through Ōkuma, generally follows the same route as the Iwaki-Sōma Road.

Creation of the municipality

Over a half a century later, on 11 November 1954, the villages of Ōno and Kumamachi merged to form the present-day town of Ōkuma.

From coal mining to nuclear power
Beginning during the 1870s, coal mining became an integral part of the economy of the Hamadōri region. This continued through the beginning stages of Japan's post-World War II rapid economic growth period, leading Fukushima Prefecture to lag behind the country as a whole in industrial and economic development. In the tail end of the 1950s, the prefecture began promoting electricity generation as a way to alleviate the economic problems on the horizon from the impending closure of the coal mines.

On 30 September – 22 October 1961 the town councils of Futaba and Ōkuma, respectively, unanimously voted to invite Tokyo Electric Power Company to build a nuclear power plant on the border of the two towns. In September 1967 construction began on unit one of the Fukushima Daiichi Nuclear Power Plant. By October 1978, units one through four, which are on the Ōkuma side of the plant, had been commissioned. Units five and six (on the Futaba side) were commissioned by March 1979.

2011 Tōhoku earthquake, tsunami, and nuclear disaster

On 11 March 2011 the 2011 Tōhoku earthquake and tsunami occurred, causing severe damage to Ōkuma and especially devastating coastal areas. The tsunami hit and flooded the Fukushima Daiichi Nuclear Power Plant, located on the Pacific coast of Ōkuma, and set off the Fukushima Daiichi nuclear disaster. By the following morning, the Japanese government had ordered residents to evacuate to outside of a  radius of the power plant. Many residents were evacuated to the nearby city of Tamura, among other cities.

The temporary town office was later moved on 3 April to Aizuwakamatsu. Ōkuma residents had scattered to about 20 evacuation centers located in the cities of Tamura and Kōriyama and the towns of Miharu and Ono, and by 30 April approximately 1,800 residents had expressed the desire to also move to Aizuwakamatsu.

On 10 December 2012 Ōkuma modified the areas of the town under evacuation orders and permitted residents of select regions of the town to return to their homes. Within the first 19 days 104 residents returned, however other residents of Ōkuma, like some other communities in Fukushima, are "starting to come to terms with a sobering realization: their old homes are probably lost forever, and they must start anew elsewhere."

As of 2015, the town is aiming to develop a forested area for living by 2018. The seaside area of the town, which was once heavily populated, will be turned into a nature reserve.

In April 2019, parts of Ōkuma were deemed safe from further radiation contamination. The BBC reported that around 50 people were scheduled to move back.

Education
Ōkuma has three public elementary schools and one public junior high school operated by the town government, and one public high school operated by the Fukushima Prefectural Board of Education. The operation of all schools remains suspended indefinitely.

Transportation

Railway
 JR East – Jōban Line

Highway
  – Ōkuma Interchange

International relations
 – Bathurst, New South Wales, Australia, since March 1991

References

External links 

Official Website 

 
Towns in Fukushima Prefecture
Populated coastal places in Japan
Environmental disaster ghost towns